Export control is legislation that regulates the export of goods, software and technology. Some items could potentially be useful for purposes that are contrary to the interest of the exporting country. These items are considered to be controlled. The export of controlled item is  regulated to restrict the harmful use of those items. Many governments implement export controls. Typically, legislation lists and classifies the controlled items, classifies the destinations, and requires exporters to apply for a licence to a local government department.

A wide range of goods have been subject to export control in different jurisdictions, including arms, goods with a military potential, cryptography, currency, and precious stones or metals. Some countries prohibit the export of uranium, endangered animals, national artefacts, and goods in short supply in the country, such as medicines.

History 
The United States has had export controls since the American Revolution, although the modern export control regimes can be traced back to the Trading with the Enemy Act of 1917. A significant piece of legislation was the Export Control Act of 1940 which inter alia aimed to restrict shipments of material to pre-war Japan.  In the United Kingdom, the Import, Export and Customs Power (Defence) Act of 1939 was the main legislation prior to World War II.

Post WWII, the Coordinating Committee for Multilateral Export Controls (CoCom) was founded in 1948, and continued until 1994.  It was an early Multilateral export control regime.

Principles 
In most export control regimes, legislation lists the items which are deemed 'controlled', and lists the destinations to which exports are restricted in some way. The lists of what is controlled often arise from some harmonised regime.

Classification 
Goods may be classified using a various classification systems. The United States uses the Export Control Classification Number (ECCN), India uses the Special Chemicals, Organisms, Materials, Equipment and Technologies (SCOMET) list and Japan uses Ministry of Economy, Trade and Industry (METI) lists.

Some items may be categorised as "designed or modified for military use", some as dual use, and some will not be export controlled. Dual use means that the device has both a civilian and a military purpose.

In several jurisdictions, classifications distinguish between goods, equipment, materials, software and technology; the last two being often considered intangible. Classifications may also be by destination purpose, including cryptography, laser, sonar and torture equipment.

Destination 
An exporting country will consider the impact of its export control policy on its relationships with other countries. Sometimes countries will have trade agreements or arrangements with a group of other countries, which may specify that licences are not required for certain goods. For example, within the EU, licences are not required for shipping civilian goods to other member states; however, licences are required for restricted, military goods.

The exporting country's legislation will demand certain handling for goods in different classifications to destination countries.  This could include:
 The destination is subject to sanctions, perhaps economic sanctions.  Exports of that class of goods will not be permitted.
 Shipping the goods may require licences from the government.  These licences may require record keeping, so the exporter has to log the items and destinations.  Where records are kept, there may be an audit, or there may be some requirement to report the transactions periodically. 
 some have no restrictions and that class of goods can be shipped without impediment from export control legislation.

The end user of the goods or some broker will typically be declared, and similar restrictions apply as to countries.

Some individuals or entities may be listed, so that even if the item could normally be exported to the country without a licence, additional restrictions apply for that individual or entity.

Licence 
For any given item being exported, the categorisations will typically lead to different treatments for a given destination, e.g. 'No Licence Required' (NLR) or 'Licence Required'.

If a licence is required for the item, to the destination, the licence issuer will require information as part of the licence application, typically including:
 name, address, business number (e.g. EORI ) of the exporter
 technical details of the exported item, possibly including product documentation, part numbers and likely uses
 value of the item and quantity to be shipped.  This can be difficult to assess with intangibles (i.e. software or technology)
 actual purpose of the item, often with a declaration to this effect from the intended recipient, and assurances that the items will not be used elsewhere.
 shipment route, consignee addresses, brokers, agents and other involved third parties.

The  declaration from end user could be an End User Undertaking (EUU), an End User Statement (EUS) or an End-user certificate. These EUUs will typically include intended use, and make assurances as to the applications for the goods, e.g. not to be used within missiles.

Licences can subsequently be obtained from the appropriate government department in the exporter's jurisdiction.

A licence will usually have some terms, such as:
 obtain and keep EUUs from every destination organisation. (Applies to open-type licences; standard-type licences may require submission of the EUU at the time of licence application.)
 include the licence number with the shipping documentation
 include some text with the documentation accompanying the item
 notify some authorities and make the item available for inspection prior to shipment
 keep a records of the shipment, and allow a potential audit
 report the shipments made to some authority within some period.

Administration and enforcement 
The process of classification, assessment, licensing, and then confirming the compliance with the licence terms is typically handled by government agency in the exporting country.  These include BAFA (The Federal Office of Economics and Export Control) in Germany, BIS (and E2C2) in US, ECJU in UK.

Circumvention 
During the development of the Lockheed SR-71 Blackbird supersonic spy plane, the US used 'Third-world countries and bogus operations' in order to obtain sufficient ore to create the titanium for the aircraft

Worldwide

Organisations for harmonisation of controlled items 
These are known as Multilateral export control regimes
 Australia Group (AG)
 Chemical Weapons Convention (CWC)
 Missile Technology Control Regime (MTCR)
 Nuclear Suppliers Group (NSG)
 Wassenaar Arrangement (WA)
 Zangger Committee

The regimes mean that supporting nations will tend to have similar classifications in their individual legislation.  It reduces the administrative load on each of the nations.  The harmonised regimes reduce the opportunity for 'tourism' where a particular country is chosen for its lax controls pertaining to some particular item.  Even with the harmonised regimes, some countries choose to augment with additional classification, e.g. the USA with its 'xx99x' ECCN classifications in their Commerce Control List.

United States of America 
There are several sets of legislation covering exports in the US.
 International Traffic in Arms Regulations (ITAR) deals with military equipment and similar
 Office of Foreign Assets Control (OFAC) deals with programmes of sanctions against various entities
 Export Administration Regulations (EAR) cover exports in general.

The coordinating body for EAR is the Export Enforcement Coordination Center (E2C2), and the web-based licence system is SNAP-R.  Several of the functions of the US Bureau of Industry and Security (BIS) pertain to Export Control, including the Office for Export Enforcement.

For ITAR, the coordinating body is the Directorate of Defense Trade Controls.

Companies engaging in export may be required to establish an Export Management and Compliance Program.

There are some particular treatments for cryptographic exports, where the NSA may require separate notification of intent to publish cryptographic software. 

On October 7, 2022, the U.S. Department of Commerce announced a major set of export control policy changes toward China, with a focus on Artificial Intelligence and semiconductor technologies. In January 2023, these export controls were expanded multilaterally in an agreement between the United States, the Netherlands, and Japan.

European Union 
The export control legislation applying in the EU is Council EU Regulation 2021/821, which came in to force 2021-09-09.  This recast the previous legislation 428/2009. The regulation demands that authorisations are required for exports of sensitive items to certain places.

Competent authorities in each EU member state provide the licensing service, e.g. BAFA in Germany, SBDU in France and UAMA in Italy.

Organisations performing exports should have an Internal Compliance Programme (ICP).

The "dual use" regime was established in 2000.

United Kingdom 
The principal legislation is the retained EU regulation 428/2009 which still applies with amendments, because of the EU Withdrawal Act.  This regulation is harmonised with the Export Control Order.  The newer 'recast' EU regulation 2021/821 does not apply to mainland Britain since that comes after Brexit.   There is the similar-sounding Export Control Act of 2002 which grants powers to the Secretary of State to impose such rules and this still applies.

Since Brexit, the Northern Ireland Protocol keeps Northern Ireland within the UK customs territory, but de facto means Northern Ireland is aligned with the EU customs. Consequently exports from Northern Ireland are subject to the EU regulations, including the new EU regulation 2021/821.  No export licences are required for movement of dual-use goods between Great Britain and Northern Ireland.

The export classifications are declared in the UK strategic export control lists.

It is administered by the Export Control Joint Unit (ECJU), part of the Department for International Trade, with a web-based administration system SPIRE.  (A new system LITE is being phased in over 2021-2023.)  ECJU also manage enforcement and audit of licence compliance.  It is recommended that companies involved in exports nominate staff, conduct training, keep records, perform internal audits and commit to compliance.

Licences include Standard Individual Export Licences (SIEL), Open Individual Export Licences (OIEL) and  Open General Export Licences (OGEL) also known as General Export Authorisation (GEA), formerly known before 2013 as an Open General Licence (OGL).

See also 
 Arms control
 CITES
 Sanitary and phytosanitary (SPS) measures

References 

Export and import control
Arms control
International law
International security
Military diplomacy
Weapons trade
Regulation of technologies